The economy of Oklahoma is the 29th largest in the United States. Oklahoma's gross state product (GSP) is approximately $197.2 billion as of December 2018.

Data

Historical data
The history of Oklahoma's GSP according to the Bureau of Economic Analysis and the United States Census Bureau

GSP by industry
Industries value added to Oklahoma GDP in Q1 2020. Sectors percentages are compared to sector percentages of United States GDP.

Employment
There were approximately 1.8 million in the Oklahoma labor force in 2018. The private sector employs 90% of working Oklahomans, with the government (federal, state, and local) employing 9%. The largest employer in the state is the United States Department of Defense, which employs approximately 69,000 workers or 3.8% of all working Oklahomans. The largest private employer is Walmart, which employs approximately 32,000 workers or 1.8% of all working Oklahomans.

As of 2019, the top 20 employers in the State of Oklahoma were:

Taxes

See also

:Category:Companies based in Oklahoma
:Category:Economies by country
:Category:Economies by region
Comparison between U.S. states and countries by GDP (PPP)
List of US state economies

References

Notes
 Agriculture Sector includes establishments primarily engaged in growing crops, raising animals, harvesting timber, harvesting fish and other animals from a farm, ranch or their natural habitats
 Mining Sector includes exploration and development of minerals, including  solids such as coal and ores, liquids such as crude petroleum, and gases such as natural gas
 Construction Sector comprises establishments primarily engaged in the construction of buildings or engineering projects 
Manufacturing Sector includes establishments engaged in the mechanical, physical, or chemical transformation of materials, substances, or components into new products
Trade, Transportation, and Utitlies Sector includes wholesaling of merchandise, retailing of merchandise, passenger and freight transit, storage and warehousing of goods, and public utilities services 
Information Sector concerns publishing industries, including software publishing, motion picture and sound publishing, broadcast industries, telecommunications, and Internet service providers
Finance Sector comprises establishment engaged in financial transactions, including banking, securities, insurance, and investment advisory services
Professional Sector comprises establishments that specialize in performing professional, scientific, and technical activities for others
Education and Healthcare Sector comprises schools, colleges, universities, and training centers as well as establishments providing health care and social assistance for individuals
Entertainment Sector includes establishments that operate facilities or provide services to meet varied cultural, entertainment, and recreational interests of their patrons, such as live performances, historical exhibits, and recreationally facilities 
The Other Sector includes establishments which provide services not specifically provided for elsewhere in the classification system
Government Sector includes the executive, legislative, judicial, administrative, regulatory, and military activities of Federal, state, and local governments together with government owned enterprises

External links
 Official State of Oklahoma website
 State of Oklahoma economic development